Isaura Espinoza (born Isaura Espinoza  on August 25, 1960, in Piedras Negras, Coahuila, Mexico) is a Mexican actress.

Early life
Espinoza was born on August 25, 1960, in Piedras Negras, Coahuila, Mexico. She is a renowned theater, cinema and TV Mexican Actress.
 
Espinoza made her debut in Mexican cinema in 1973 and has since starred in 95 films and television series.

She was married with actor Sergio Sánchez, who died on September 16, 2004. With whom she had one son.

Filmography

Awards & nominations

References

External links 
 

1960 births
Living people
Mexican telenovela actresses
Mexican television actresses
Mexican film actresses
Mexican stage actresses
Actresses from Coahuila
20th-century Mexican actresses
21st-century Mexican actresses
Mexican people of Czech descent